A virtual reality roller coaster is a special kind of amusement park ride attraction, consisting of a roller coaster facility or ride that can be experienced with virtual reality headsets. The setup has been invented by Thomas Wagner, who has also produced most of the worldwide installations with his company VR Coaster GmbH & Co. KG since late 2015. Since then, several theme parks all over the world have been adapting this technology to extend their existing coaster facilities.

Background and history 
While virtual reality roller coaster simulations quickly became quite popular after the appearance of the Oculus Rift, it showed that dizziness and motion sickness, known as virtual reality sickness, would be a major problem. This was caused by the offset between the simulated motion in virtual reality and the lack of real motion, as the inner sense of balance wouldn't feel the appropriate forces and turns. In order to test if this could be overcome by synchronizing virtual reality movement to real motion, a research group of the University of Applied Sciences, Kaiserslautern, led by Thomas Wagner, together with roller coaster manufacturer Mack Rides and Europa-Park, has been conducting experiments on actual roller coaster facilities since early 2014. It showed that, with a precise synchronization, not only the nausea would disappear, but also a new kind of attraction was created as, for the first time, this setup allowed for a simulation ride to feature continuous G forces, zero gravity and drops (or so-called air time).

Still, the technical setup of the 2014 experiments was not feasible yet for a permanent installation. Most of all, mounting a computer on a coaster train would not have worked due to the continuous heavy vibrations; also the usual cable connection of a classical virtual reality headset like the Oculus Rift would have meant a serious safety hazard. Wagner and his team could eventually overcome these problems by deploying so called mobile virtual reality headsets like the Samsung Gear VR, where the entire image generation happens directly inside of the actual headset. The very first virtual reality roller coaster installations have been opened to the public in late 2015, starting at Europa-Park, Germany, followed by Canada's Wonderland and Universal Studios Japan, all of them developed by the startup company VR Coaster, which originated from Wagners Research Group.

In 2014, another startup called Astral Vision presented a wearable technology prototype for theme park rides that uses mobile phone sensors and does not require additional sensors.

As of June 2016, 17 theme parks worldwide were operating virtual reality roller coasters.

Technical solutions 
Key to a comfortable virtual reality experience on an actual moving ride attraction is a precise synchronization of the virtual ride animation. To achieve this, the coaster train is equipped with special hardware that monitors the position of the train in the track layout and then wirelessly transmits this information to the headsets of the riders. This is also crucial, as the virtual reality experience needs to run in absolute tracking mode (unlike relative tracking when used at home, where the virtual reality view automatically rotates with a virtual vehicle), so without a precise tracking solution, curves and turns would not be in the right place. In other words, a virtual cockpit must always turn and travel in exactly the same direction as the real coaster car, which would not be possible without an automated synchronization. Still, as the human sense of balance can't detect absolute velocities but only acceleration and turns, speed and dimensions can be altered in virtual reality. Even curves can be bent to different angles, as long as the relative direction of the turn is preserved (clockwise or counterclockwise).

Experience 
As virtual reality allows for several modifications and extensions of the actual track layout, the size of the virtual reality track can be much larger than the real one. This of course means that speeds can be much faster and heights much taller, as these aspects also grow with the increased dimensions. Most of all, there is no need to show an actual track or rails (which would give away what element comes next), other than for dramaturgical reasons. As the rider is totally immersed in the virtual reality world, one can even be tricked by giving hints on a wrong track direction and then e.g. have a giant creature grabbing the virtual cockpit and carrying it into a different direction (which turns out to be the actual direction of the rails). Also, the effect of physical track elements like block brakes can be utilized in the virtual reality experience for dramatic elements like crashing through a virtual barrier or building Riders report after their first virtual reality roller coaster ride that it is unlike anything they have ever experienced before.

Operation 
Riders are provided with virtual reality headsets to wear whilst on the ride. These headsets may be portable, or permanently attached to the ride itself and will display a synchronised video to the riders who experience the motions of the ride combined with the alternate reality provided through the headsets. After the ride, headsets are sanitised and (where applicable) recharged for future use.

In most cases, the virtual reality aspect of the ride is optional, and in some cases a supplement may be required for use.

Appearances

References 

 
Virtual reality
Virtual reality
Virtual reality